National parks of Canada are protected natural spaces throughout the country that represent distinct geographical regions of the nation. Under the administration of Parks Canada, a government branch, national parks allow for public enjoyment without compromising the area for future generations, including the management of Canadian wildlife and habitat within the ecosystems of the park. Within Parks Canada's administration is a wide range of protected areas, encompassing National Historic Sites, National Marine Conservation Areas (NMCA), and national park reserves.

Canada's first national park, located in Banff, was established in 1885. Tourism and commercialization dominated early park development, followed closely by resource extraction. Commodifying the parks for the profit of Canada's national economy as well as conserving the natural areas for public and future use became an integrated method of park creation. The process of establishing national parks has included the often forced displacement of indigenous and non-indigenous residents of areas within the proposed park boundaries. The conflicts between the creation of parks and the residents of the area have been negotiated through co-management practices, as Parks Canada acknowledged the importance of community involvement in order to sustain a healthy ecosystem.

A transition towards developing parks as a place of preservation began with the National Parks Act of 1930. This event marked a shift in park management practices. Revised in 1979 under the National Parks Policy, the Act placed greater emphasis on preserving the natural areas in an unimpaired state through ecological integrity and restoration, moving away from development based heavily on profit. Acting as national symbols, Canada's national parks exist in every province and territory representing a variety of landscapes that mark Canada's natural heritage.

Timeline

1885 – Banff National Park established as Canada's first National Park.  Originally this park was called Banff Hot Springs Reserve and later the Rocky Mountains National Park.
1908–1912 – Four national parks established in Alberta and Saskatchewan with a mission akin to national wildlife refuges. All would be abolished by 1947 once their goals were achieved.
1911 – Dominion Parks Branch created, the world's first national park service. Resided in the Department of the Interior. Now known as Parks Canada, the governing body of Canada's national parks.
1930 – Canada's parliament passes the first National Parks Act, regulating protection of the parks.
1930 – Transfer of resources agreement signed.
1964 – First National Parks Policy.
1970s – National Parks System Plan devised with an aim to protect a representative sample of each of Canada's 39 natural spaces.
1979 – National Parks policy is revised to make preserving ecological integrity the priority in Canadian Parks, ending the so-called dual-mandate with recreational uses.
1984 – First national park established through a land claim agreement.
1988 – National Parks Act amended formalizing the principle of ecological integrity in the park system.
1989 – The Endangered Spaces campaign is launched by the Canadian Parks and Wilderness Society and World Wildlife Canada to encourage the completion of the national parks system. The goal of the campaign is to have parks and protected areas that represent each of the country's natural regions.
2011 – To mark the 100th anniversary of the creation of the national parks system, Parks Canada, Primitive Entertainment and Discovery World HD commissioned the National Parks Project to create a series of documentary films about various parks in the system.
2017 – Free national parks in 2017: In celebration of Canada's 150th birthday on 1 July 2017, Parks Canada offered free admission to national parks and national historic sites for the entire year.

Creation and development

On July 20, 1871, the Crown Colony of British Columbia committed to Confederation with Canada. Under the union's terms, Canada was to begin construction of a transcontinental railway to connect the Pacific Coast to the eastern provinces. As the Canadian Pacific Railway surveyors began to study the land in 1875, the location of the country's natural resources sprouted further interest. Evidence of minerals quickly introduced the construction of mines and resource exploitation in Canada's previously untouched wilderness. Exploration led to the discovery of hot springs near Banff, Alberta, and in November 1885, the Canadian Government made the springs public property, removing them from the possibility of private ownership and exploitation. This event brought about the beginning of Canada's movement towards preserving land and setting it aside for public usage as national parks. By the late 1880s, Thomas White, Canada's Minister of the Interior, responsible for federal land management, Indian affairs, and natural resources extraction, began establishing a legislative motion towards establishing Canada's first national park in Banff.

May 1911 marked one of the most significant events in the administration and development of national parks in Canada as the Dominion Forest Reserves and Parks Act received royal assent. This law saw the creation of the first administrative body, the Dominion Parks Branch, now known as Parks Canada, to administer national parks in Canada. With the Branch in place, the parks system expanded from Banff eastward, combining both use and protection as the foundation to national park management.

The major motives behind the creation of national parks in Canada were profit and preservation. Inspired by the establishment and success of Yellowstone National Park in the United States, Canada blended the conflicting ideas of preservation and commercialism in order to satisfy its natural resource needs, conservationist views of modern management, a growing public interest in the outdoors and the new popularity of getting back to nature. This growing interest to escape the hustle and bustle of the city brought about ideas of conserving Canada's unspoiled wildernesses by creating public parks. As a country dependent on natural resources, Canada's national parks represent an example of a compromise between the demand for profit from the land's resources and tourism, with the need for preservation and sustainable development.

While conservationist ideas and a common Canadian movement towards getting back to nature were evident in the early development of national parks in Canada, a greater role was played by chambers of commerce, local governments, promoters of tourism and recreational groups who advocated profit-driven commercial development, while incorporating wildlife preservation when possible. Canada's national parks allowed the public an avenue into nature, while also integrating ideas of preserving Canada's scenic landscape and wildlife populations in an era of development and major resource extraction.

Tourism and commercialization

The integration of public visitation for national parks in Canada heavily contributed to the beginnings of public constituencies for certain parks. The parks who mobilized with a public constituency tended to prosper at a faster rate.  As a tactic to increase the number of people travelling to and through national parks, members of each constituency surrounding national parks began to advocate the construction of well-built roads, including the development of the Trans-Canada Highway. As the main highway travelling through the Canadian Rockies, the Trans-Canada Highway has provided accessible visitation and commerce to the area. The highway is designed to provide a heavy flow of traffic, while also including many accessible pull-offs and picnic areas. With a high frequency of travellers and many destinations to stop, tourism boomed after the Trans-Canada Highway was established. As the highway travels through Banff and the Bow Valley area, it includes scenic views of most of the mountains, and an environment rich in wildlife.

With an increase in tourism to Rocky Mountain Park, growth and prosperity came to the town of Banff. The Banff hot springs were made more accessible after a tunnel was blasted in 1886. Horse-drawn carriages were replaced by buses and taxis, and by the 1960s small cabins had been largely replaced by hotels and motels as the community became geared towards building the national park as a tourist destination. In 1964 the first visitor service centre was established at Lake Louise Station, which included the development of a campground, trailer park, and other attractions. Cave and Basin Springs were forced to rebuild their bathing pools in 1904 and then again in 1912, because of growing public interest in the hot springs. By 1927 campground accommodations at Tunnel Mountain were adapting to include room for trailers as well as tents. Due to increased demand the campground was extended, and by 1969 it was the biggest campground in the national park system. Banff became a year-round recreational centre as the growth of winter sport activities provided added incentive for tourism. The implementation of T-bars and chairlifts on Banff's ski hills helped develop Banff into a ski and winter sports destination.

Conflicts over creation

Resource development
Since the inception of Canada's national parks, business and profit had been a major element to their creation and development. Although tourism was the first source of profit in the national parks, the exploitation of natural resources such as coal, lumber, and other minerals became another major area of revenue. These resources were found in abundance in the Rocky Mountains and were interpreted as being inexhaustible.

Coal was the most plentiful and profitable of all the minerals and therefore its mining in parks was accepted by politicians and Canadian Pacific Railway officials. This was demonstrated by the creation of Bankhead, a coal town on the road to Lake Minnewanka that was established. This coal town was not viewed as a detriment to the overall scenery of Banff National Park, but was instead an added attraction for visitors. In this case, resource exploitation and tourism worked in conjunction with each other to create a more profitable national park. Although tourism and resource development could work together, it was clear from policy making that tourism became secondary to resource exploitation.

The resources that were exploited from the national parks were essential to the CPR's income as it freighted these resources across the country. In 1887, the Rocky Mountains Park Act was established under the Macdonald government and it reflected the importance of resource exploitation for Canada's economy. Under this regulation, national parks were not fully preserved in their natural states as mining, logging and grazing continued to be permitted.

When the Rocky Mountains Park Bill was proposed, it elicited various criticisms at the time, one being the implicit contradiction between the exploitation of resources within this national reservation. However, the overarching nineteenth century ideology that lumbering and mining would contribute to the usefulness of the reserve as opposed to depreciating the park overshadowed the concerns of resource exploitation. The natural resources within the parks were seen as being unlimited and therefore should be used as it was economically beneficial for the nation.

By 1911, as Canadians became aware of the depletion occurring within America's natural resources, a debate focused on the extent of resource exploitation in Canada's national parks erupted. This debate began as early as 1906 at the Forestry Convention in Ottawa as it stimulated a new interest in conservation which spoke to the governmental, academic, and public level. Canada's national parks were no longer places of unlimited natural resources, but were now considered a place where resources needed to be conserved through regulation to ensure future and continued use.

J.B. Harkin, the Parks Commissioner in 1911, advocated the complete eradication of coal and mineral extraction in the parks. However, Harkin's vision did not come to fruition until 1930 when the National Parks Act was established. Under this act, mineral exploration and development were banned and only limited use of timber was permitted within the parks. For Canada to continue its economic success through resource development, the boundaries of Canada's national parks were altered prior to the 1930 Act in order to exclude resource rich land from park areas. The exclusion of resource development in Canada's national parks marked a minor shift towards preservationist attitudes over Canada's parks as recreational use and development was still permitted.

Human conflict

The initial ideal of national parks was one of uninhabited wilderness. Creating this required the displacement of indigenous and non-indigenous residents who lived within intended park boundaries, and restrictions on the way these residents had previously used the land and resources within parks for subsistence.

Jasper National Park, established in 1907, restricted the hunting and other income-generating and culturally valuable activities of the aboriginal groups who had used the region. Jasper is a large park in a southern, frequently visited portion of Canada, and one of many parks geared towards tourism more than preservation. Most parks are designed to have both the appeal of uninhabited wilderness and have amenities and roads to facilitate visitors. Human activity within the park was allowed, but primarily activities that generated revenue, such as snowboarding and lodging for tourists. Some have claimed that the selection of which activities to allow had a non-native bias, as it precluded traditional sources of subsistence such as hunting and trapping.

Parks in less frequently visited, northern parts of Canada were created with more consideration of aboriginal usage. Kluane National Park and Reserve in the Yukon did have initial restrictions on hunting in order to preserve the presence of wildlife in the park, as did Ivvavik National Park in the Northern Yukon. Through grassroots organizations and political lobbying, indigenous residents of these areas were able to have greater influence over the process of park creation. For both Kluane and Ivvavik parks, indigenous organizations protested and testified to Parliamentary Committees, describing how these restrictions infringed on their ability to provide for themselves through traditional fishing, hunting, and trapping. Ivvavik National Park, established in 1984, was the first in Canada to be created through a comprehensive land claim settlement, and set a precedent for collaboration and co-management in future parks. In June 1984, the Inuvialuit Final Agreement was signed, which deviated from past parks by committing to a more extensive inclusion of aboriginal interests and gave the Inuvialuit exclusive rights to hunting and harvesting game within the park. This agreement was an example of and the beginning of co-management, which ensured indigenous voices would be heard and given equal representatives on parks boards.

Non-indigenous groups were also dispossessed from their land during the creation of national parks, such as the Acadians of Kouchibouguac National Park in New Brunswick. This park was created in 1969 and included recognition of the aboriginal groups who had once resided there but no recognition of the Acadians who comprised approximately 85 percent of the over 1,500 people who were displaced to create the park. Many inhabits dispossessed of their land by Parks Canada resisted, and the Acadian residents' resistance of eviction was extensive enough to delay the official opening of the park until 1979. Through protest and civil disobedience, they won greater compensation from the government to address the loss of fishing within the park that had previously been their main source of income. The resistance of the Acadians impacted future park creation, as in 1979 Parks Canada announced that it would no longer use forced relocation in new parks. An advisory committee was created by Parks Canada in 2008 to reflect on the Kouchibouguac process and address outstanding grievances.

Shifting value behind park creation and management

Conservation movements
In the late 19th century, Canadians began to change their view of nature and resources from one in which the wilderness was seen as a land of abundance to one where the land became seen as a limited storehouse and opinions started to focus on conservationist ideas.

Created in 1909, the Commission of Conservation became the Canadian forum for conservation issues, acting as an advisory and consultative body used to answer questions related to conservation and better utilization of Canada's natural and human resources. The Commission focused on a concept that maximized future profits through good management in the present. Rather than preserving through non-use, the commission was concerned with managing resources for long-term gain.

Other conservation-minded organizations, like the Alpine Club, had different ideas that focused on the preservation of natural wilderness and opposed any type of development or construction. This movement was successful as the creation of parks solely for preservation purposes, like the bird sanctuary in Point Pelee, began developing. In order to push their views further, this movement, headed by James B. Harkin and Arthur Oliver Wheeler, was forced to argue that divine scenery was itself a source of profit – tourism – in order to push aside what they saw as a far greater avenue of exploitation: resource extraction. By 1930, even the conservation movements within Canada came to understand that the country's national parks had an entrenched system of profit-based motives.

Ecological integrity
According to Parks Canada, ecological integrity is defined as a state where three elements exist: non-living elements, living elements, and series of ecological functions. By having all three elements, there exists a healthy ecosystem. Ecosystems in national parks have often been damaged due to the exploitation of resources, the expansion of tourism, and external land use practices outside national parks. Through Parks Canada realizing the necessity of managing national parks by human hands to maintain biotic and abiotic components, Parks Canada placed an emphasis on ecological integrity within the national parks that marked a shift from profit to preservation.

The change in values is derived from the establishment of 1930 National Parks Act that limited use of resource for park management, and in 1979, under revised National Parks Policy, the maintenance of ecological integrity was prioritized for the preservation of national parks of Canada. In 1988, the National Parks Act was amended and the regulation of ecological integrity was embodied. However, due to the conflicting interests of profit and preservation, the maintenance of ecological integrity has progressed slowly.

The big movement on maintenance of ecological integrity has happened since 2001. Canada National Parks Act of 2001 reinforced the necessity of maintenance and restorations of ecological integrity by saving natural resources and ecosystem. It sets new principles for park management plans. Wilderness areas in the Banff, Jasper, Yoho and Kootenay National Parks have been officially designate land as wilderness in national parks. The boundaries of all communities in national parks are changed and the developments of commerce in their communities are restricted. Profit no longer became priority and initiative for preservation through ecological integrity increased.

To maintain or restore ecological integrity, ecosystem restorations are implemented in many parks, attempting to bring back damaged ecosystems to their original healthy state and making them sustainable. For example, Grasslands National park brought back Bison bison for a prairie restoration. The bison grazing patterns help to maintain a variety of prairie biodiversity. In Gwaii Haanas National Park, removing Norway rats, which were accidentally brought in the area, is conducted because they eat eggs, some young and even adults' seabird, and reducing the seabird's population. Staffs monitor for the return of rats by trapping and poison baits for recovering native seabird populations.

Co-management
Through parks policies and operation practices, Parks Canada has recognized the importance of working together with indigenous peoples and other communities to manage parks' healthy ecosystem within and around national parks."				

In 1984, Ivvavik National Park was established as a result of an Aboriginal land claim agreement. Now, Ivvavik is managed co-operatively by Parks Canada and the Inuvialuit. Their mutual goals are to protect wild life, keep the ecosystem healthy and protect their cultural resources. In addition, they ensure the preservation of the Inuvialuit traditional way of living, including trapping, hunting and fishing.  									

Another example is Torngat Mountains National Park. In 2005, it was established as a result of the Labrador Inuit Land Claims Agreement. It preserves the aboriginal rights of the Labrador Inuit in Canada, which are land, resources and self-government rights. The federal government also signed the Labrador Inuit Park Impacts and Benefits Agreement with Inuit Association. As with the Ivvavik agreement, it ensures that Inuit can continue to use land and resources as their traditional activities and keep their exclusive relationship with the land and ecosystems. In addition, they agreed to manage the park cooperatively. A seven-member co-operative management board will be established to advise the federal minister of Environment for the matters of parks eco-management.

Parks Canada recognized indigenous knowledge and their unique historical and cultural relationship with the lands, and thus Parks Canada started to cooperate with indigenous people for park management.

Adding to the system

Proposed national parks and national park reserves
All existing national park reserves are, by definition, proposed national parks. These include:
Gwaii Haanas
Gulf Islands
Kluane (a portion of the park is designated as a Reserve)
Mealy Mountains
Mingan Archipelago
Naats'ihch'oh
Nahanni
Pacific Rim
Sable Island
Thaidene Nëné

The following areas have been proposed as Parks or Reserves, studied, and discussed among stakeholders:
Pitaweikek in Prince Edward Island (as a National Park Reserve).
South Okanagan-Similkameen in the southern interior of British Columbia (as a national park reserve).

In addition, Parks Canada is considering other areas for future national parks:
Manitoba Lowlands (north-western Lake Winnipeg)
Expanding Waterton Lakes National Park in Alberta into the Flathead Valley in British Columbia (as a national park reserve)

NMCA and NMCA Reserves
National Marine Conservation Areas (NMCAs) are a relatively new creation within the park system. There are currently three NMCAs:

Fathom Five National Marine Park, Ontario
Lake Superior NMCA, Ontario
Saguenay–St. Lawrence Marine Park, Quebec

Fathom Five National Marine Park and Saguenay–St. Lawrence Marine Park were created prior to the NMCA concept, and subsequently classified as an NMCA without changing their legal names. NMCAs have a different mandate than their terrestrial counterparts. They are designed for sustainable use, although they usually also contain areas designed to protect ecological integrity.

Similar to national park reserves, National Marine Conservation Area Reserves are intended to become full NMCAs once claims are resolved. There is currently one NMCA Reserve: 
Gwaii Haanas National Marine Conservation Area Reserve and Haida Heritage Site, adjacent to the national park reserve of the same name, in British Columbia

Two areas are under consideration as a National Marine Conservation Area or NMCA Reserve:
Southern Strait of Georgia NMCA Reserve, in British Columbia, surrounding Gulf Islands National Park Reserve—a feasibility study is underway
Tallurutiup Imanga NMCA, in Nunavut

National landmarks
In addition to national parks, a National Landmarks program was foreseen in the 1970s and 1980s, but has not yet been established beyond a single property. Landmarks were intended to protect specific natural features considered "outstanding, exceptional, unique, or rare to this country. These natural features would typically be isolated entities and of scientific interest."

To date, only one landmark has been established—Pingo Canadian Landmark—in the Northwest Territories. Another was proposed at the same time (1984)—Nelson Head Canadian Landmark—on the southern tip of Banks Island, also in the Northwest Territories. The legislation providing for the Landmark required a formal request be made by the Minister of the Environment within 10 years (until 1994). None was ever made.

See also
List of national parks of Canada
Protected areas of Canada
International Union for Conservation of Nature

References

Further reading 

 Campbell, Claire Elizabeth (ed.). A Century of Parks in Canada, 1911-2011. Calgary: University of Calgary Press, 2011.
 MacEachern, Alan. Natural Selections: National Parks in Atlantic Canada, 1935-1970. Montreal and Kingston: McGill-Queen's University Press, 2001.
 Reichwein, PearlAnn. Climber's Paradise: Making Canada's Mountain National Parks, 1906-1974. Edmonton: University of Alberta Press, 2014.

External links

Parks Canada Official Site
National Parks System Plan
Canadian Parks and Wilderness Society (CPAWS)
World Wildlife Fund – Canada 
National Park Warden Association
Atlas of Canada – National Parks
The Enduring Wilderness, a tour of Canada's National Parks

 
1885 establishments in Canada